The Taj Mahal is a mausoleum in Agra, India, built by Mughal Emperor Shah Jahan.

Taj Mahal may also refer to:

Places
 Taj Mahal Bangladesh, a replica in Bangladesh
 Taj Mahal, Bhopal, the palace of Sultan Shah Jahan, Begum of Bhopal
 Taj Mahal, Bulandshahr (also known as Taj Mahal or Mini Taj Mahal or Qadri's Taj Mahal, and officially known as Maqbara Yadgare Mohabbat Tajammuli Begum), a replica of the historic Taj Mahal of Agra located in Kaser Kalan, a small village in Bulandshahr of Uttar Pradesh, India
 Taj Mahal, Iran, a village in Kerman Province, Iran

Brands and enterprises
 Taj Mahal, an Indian lager produced by United Breweries Group
 Taj Mahal Palace & Tower, a hotel in Mumbai, India
 Trump Taj Mahal, a hotel and casino resort in Atlantic City, New Jersey, US; now known as the Hard Rock Hotel & Casino Atlantic City

People
 Taj Mahal (musician) (born 1942), American blues musician

Arts, entertainment, and media

Films
 Taj Mahal (1941 film), a 1941 Bollywood film
 Taj Mahal (1963 film), 1963 Hindi film by M. Sadiq
 Taj Mahal (1995 film), 1995 film produced by D. Ramanaidu
 Taj Mahal (1999 film), a Tamil film directed by Bharathiraja
 Taj Mahal (2008 film), a Kannada film directed by R. Chandru
 Taj Mahal (2015 film)
 Taj Mahal: An Eternal Love Story, a 2005 Hindi film

Music
 Taj Mahal (album)
 "Taj Mahal", a song by Jorge Ben Jor

Other uses in arts, entertainment, and media
 Taj Mahal (board game), introduced in 2000 in Germany

See also
 Baby Taj, Tomb of I'timād-ud-Daulah, Agra, India